Ptiolina obscura   is a species of 'snipe flies' belonging to the family Rhagionidae.

It is a Palearctic species found over most of Europe

Description 
Flies of this genus are tiny and black, quite unlike the normal conception of Rhagionidae. They may easily be mistaken for small Empididae and are  little known probably because the species sometimes occur in considerable numbers for a very short period.
Ptiolina can be confused only with Spania or Symphoromyia. Symphoromyia is distinguished by the kidney-shaped third antennal segment, or by having hairs on the metapleuron. In Ptiolina the metapleura (immediately in front of halteres) are bare. Separating Ptiolina from Spania is more difficult. The terminal style of the antenna is centrally placed in Ptiolina, Spania lacks a true style, but the ventral margin of the last antennal segment is produced into a pseudostyle.

The males are darker, more chocolate coloured than the females.

Biology
Ptiolina is a stem borer of mosses.

References

External links
Fauna Europaea

Rhagionidae
Insects described in 1814
Diptera of Europe
Taxa named by Carl Fredrik Fallén